How to Draw a Bunny: A Ray Johnson Portrait, is a 2002 American documentary film about the Detroit-born pop, collage and performance artist Ray Johnson.

Summary
Filmmakers John Walter and Andrew L. Moore delve into the mysterious life and death of Johnson, an artist whose “world was made up of amazing coincidences, serendipities and karmic gags,” according to Michael Kimmelman of The New York Times. After Johnson's suicide, Moore and Walter conducted interviews with artists including Christo, Chuck Close, Roy Lichtenstein, Judith Malina, and James Rosenquist. In addition, they gathered photographs, works of art, and home movies, which were edited into a fast-paced narrative exploring the artist's life.

Reception
The filmmakers “couldn’t have chosen a more elusive subject for a movie; their success in evoking Johnson, and in documenting his world, is a triumph of sympathy over psychology, memory over historicism,” wrote Stuart Klawans for The Nation.

It has a score of 78 on Metacritic.

Accolades
The film premiered at the 2002 Sundance Film Festival, where it won the Special Jury Prize. The film also won the Grand Prix du Public 2002 at the Rencontres Internationales de Cinema in Paris and was nominated for a 2003 Independent Spirit Award and listed in New York Magazine’s “Top Ten of 2004.”

References

External links
 

New York Times film review
The entire film officially posted by BASEBALZAC on Vimeo

2002 films
Documentary films about visual artists
2002 documentary films
Mr. Mudd films
Collage film
American documentary films
Pop art
2000s English-language films
2000s American films